Paula Winslowe (born Winifred Reyleche; March 23, 1910 – March 6, 1996) was an American television, radio and voice actress, best known for her role as the voice of Bambi's mother in the 1942 movie Bambi.

Career

In the early 1930s, Winslowe acted with the Marta Oatman Players and McFadden Productions.

Winslowe played the role of Mrs. Martha Conklin in Our Miss Brooks on both radio and television. On radio, she played Peg Riley in The Life of Riley, She was also heard in Silver Theater, Big Town and Elliott Lewis' shows Broadway Is My Beat and On Stage.

She briefly portrayed Mrs. Foster on Big Town, which starred Edward G. Robinson. She starred in several episodes of Suspense, including June 14, 1955 ("The Whole Town's Sleeping") written by Ray Bradbury; July 11, 1956 ("Want Ad"); January 24, 1956 ("The Cellar Door"); and June 5, 1956 ("The Twelfth Rose").

Winslowe was cast in numerous TV shows, including I Love Lucy and 2 episodes of the courtroom drama series Perry Mason : in season 1, 1957 episode entitled "The Case of the Drowning Duck" and in season 6, 1962 episode entitled "The Case of the Unsuitable Uncle", in which she played a night court judge. She played multiple characters on The Adventures of Ozzie and Harriet. She also voiced Greta Gravel on The Flintstones (ep. The Entertainer).

In animated films, she did two voices in Disney's Bambi: Bambi's mother and the pheasant who panics when the hunters come leading to her demise.

Jean Harlow died of kidney disease shortly before the completion of the film Saratoga in 1937. The film was 90% completed and MGM used body double Mary Dees for Harlow. Dees's voice was higher than that of Harlow, so MGM allowed Winslowe to step in as a voice double. The film was a box office hit.

Personal life
Winslowe was a lifelong Democrat and a practicing Roman Catholic.

Filmography
The Little Mole (1941), Mother Mole
Bambi (1942), Pheasant / Bambi's Mother (voice, uncredited)
North by Northwest (1959), Woman at Auction (uncredited)

References

External links
 
 

1910 births
1996 deaths
20th-century American actresses
American radio actresses
American voice actresses
American television actresses
American stage actresses
Actresses from North Dakota
People from Walsh County, North Dakota
California Democrats
North Dakota Democrats
American Roman Catholics
Burials at Holy Cross Cemetery, Culver City